San Pedro Claver, commonly known as San Pedro, is an African football club based in Ebebiyín, Equatorial Guinea.

The club is likely best known for their 2007 appearance in the CAF Confederation Cup, in which they lost to Benfica Luanda of Angola 7–1 on aggregate in the preliminary round.

San Pedro Claver withdrew from the 2008 championship and no record exists of their being active since.

Performance in CAF competitions
CAF Confederation Cup: 1 appearance
2007 CAF Confederation Cup

References

External links

Football clubs in Equatorial Guinea